Jean d'Orleans or John of Orléans may refer to:

John, Count of Angoulême (1399-1467)
Jean de Dunois (1402-1468)
Jean d'Orléans-Longueville (1484-1533)
Jean d'Orléans, duc de Guise (1874-1940)
Jean d'Orléans (1965-), Orléanist claimant
Master of the Parement, French painter in Paris under the reign of Charles V. about 1370 - 1400